Janne Ojala (born 7 September 1977) is a Finnish former professional tennis player.

Ojala, a Finnish national champion in 1998 and 1999, reached a best singles ranking of 295 while competing on the professional tour. He won four ITF Futures singles titles and was a semi-finalist at the Tampere Challenger in 2001. His career included two Davis Cup appearances for Finland, against Norway in 2003 and Luxembourg in 2004.

ITF Futures titles

Singles: (4)

Doubles: (6)

See also
List of Finland Davis Cup team representatives

References

External links
 
 
 

1977 births
Living people
Finnish male tennis players